The 1946–47 Serie A season was the 14th season of the Serie A, the top level of ice hockey in Italy. Hockey Club Milano won the championship by defeating HC Diavoli Rossoneri Milano in the final.

Qualification
The two Serie B group winners played against each other for the right to participate in the Serie A.
Misurina - Hockey Club Milano II 3:2

Regular season

Playoffs

Semifinals 
HC Diavoli Rossoneri Milano - Misurina 13:2
Hockey Club Milano - SG Cortina

3rd place 
 SG Cortina - Misurina 7:3 (2:1, 3:2, 2:0)

Final
Hockey Club Milano - HC Diavoli Rossoneri Milano 2:1

External links
 Season on hockeytime.net

1946–47 in Italian ice hockey
Serie A (ice hockey) seasons
Italy